Čubrilo is a Serbian surname, derived from the Serbian adjective čubar ("savory"). It is the basis of the patronymic Čubrilović. It may refer to:

Milica Čubrilo, former Serbian Minister for Diaspora
Jelena Čubrilo (born 1994), Serbian women footballer
Nemanja Čubrilo, Serbian volleyball player
Aleksandar Čubrilo (born 1975), former Serbian basketball player

See also
Čubrić, surname

Serbian surnames